The 2014 Oceania Handball Nations Cup was the ninth edition of the Oceania Handball Nations Cup, held from 25 to 26 April 2014 in Auckland, New Zealand. It acted originally as the qualifying competition for the 2015 World Men's Handball Championship, securing one vacancy for the World Championship. The spot was taken away by the IHF on 8 July 2014.

Australia and New Zealand played a two-game series to determine the winner.

Overview

All times are local (UTC+12).

Game 1

Game 2

References

External links
Results at todor66

Oceania Handball Championship
Oceania Handball Nations Cup
Oceania Handball Nations Cup
Oceania Handball Nations Cup
April 2014 sports events in New Zealand